Go Yeong-sam (born 7 May 1971) is a South Korean boxer. He competed in the men's heavyweight event at the 1996 Summer Olympics.

References

1971 births
Living people
South Korean male boxers
Olympic boxers of South Korea
Boxers at the 1996 Summer Olympics
Place of birth missing (living people)
Asian Games silver medalists for South Korea
Asian Games medalists in boxing
Boxers at the 1994 Asian Games
Medalists at the 1994 Asian Games
Heavyweight boxers
20th-century South Korean people
21st-century South Korean people